is a rural district located in Aomori Prefecture, Japan.

As of September 2013, the district had an estimated population of 1,505 and an area of 246.05 km2. Much the city of Hirosaki was formerly part of Nakatsugaru District. In terms of national politics, the district is represented in the Diet of Japan's House of Representatives as a part of the Aomori 3rd district.

Towns and villages
Nishimeya

History
The area of Nakatsugaru District was formerly part of Mutsu Province. At the time of the Meiji restoration of 1868, the area consisted of one town and 134 villages, all under the control of Hirosaki Domain. Aomori Prefecture was founded on December 13, 1871, and Nakatsugaru District was carved out for former Tsugaru District on October 30, 1878.
 

With the establishment of the municipality system on April 1, 1889, Nakatsugaru District, organized into one city (Hirosaki) and 16 villages, were established.

 March 1, 1955 – The villages of Shimizu, Watoku, Toyoda, Horikoshi, Chitose, Fujishiro, Niina, Funasawa, Takasugi, Susono, Higashimeya were annexed by Hirosaki; The villages of Ōura and Komagoshi were merged into Iwaki.
 February 1, 1961 - Iwaki was elevated to town status
 February 27, 2006 - Iwaki and the village of Sōma were annexed by the city of Hirosaki

References

Districts in Aomori Prefecture